HMS Lizard was a Jackal-class second-class iron paddle gunvessel of the Royal Navy. She was built by Robert Napier and Sons at Govan to a design by William Symonds, the Surveyor of the Navy. She was launched in 1844, was damaged at the Anglo-French blockade of the Río de la Plata, performed fishery protection duties off Scotland and broken up in 1869.

Design
Orders for Lizard and her sister  were placed on 16 January 1844. They were designed by the builder, Robert Napier and Sons and approved on 17 April 1844 by the Surveyor of the Navy, Sir William Symonds.

Lizard was fitted with a Napier two-cylinder side-lever steam engine driving side paddles. The engine was rated at 150 nominal horsepower and on trials developed . She was provided with two gaff-rigged masts, making her a schooner. Her armament consisted of a single 18-pounder (22cwt) carronade on a pivot mounting and two 24-pounder (13cwt) carronades.

Construction
Both ships were built at Napier's Govan yard. Jackall was built as yard number 8, and Lizard as number 9.  Lizard was launched on 28 December 1844, exactly a month after Jackal. After fitting out, Lizards first commissioning took place on 27 November 1845.

Service
Lizards first commission was in the Mediterranean, and later on the south-east coast of South America. She took part in an Anglo-French action in Uruguay in 1845, during which she was "riddled from stem to stern" passing the San Lorenzo shore battery, and suffered 4 men killed and 4 wounded. On 1 August 1848, she assisted in the refloating on the British merchant ship Sappho, which had run aground in the River Plate on 23 July.

Fate
Lizard was broken up at Chatham in April 1869.

Notes

References

 
 

Ships built on the River Clyde
1844 ships
Victorian-era gunboats of the United Kingdom
Gunvessels of the Royal Navy